Primitive Love is the ninth studio album and second English-language record by the Miami Sound Machine, released in August 1985, by Epic Records.

A 2CD remastered version of the album was scheduled for March 31, 2017 by Vibe on Records, but it was postponed because Estefan is working on her new album. To date there is no set date for the re-release; however, the track listing was revealed to the public: it will include five songs that were previously unreleased on CD, sixteen remixes, two soundtrack songs, one demo and the Spanish version of "Words Get in the Way". The album sold over 6 million copies worldwide.

Background
This album was a follow-up to the band's previous releases in every sense: in the music, in the rhythms, and in Gloria Estefan's vocals. Previous releases by Miami Sound Machine had failed to achieve much in the way of crossover success. However, with the release of Primitive Love in 1985, their distinctive sound was finally being heard by a wider audience, both in the United States and abroad.

This album was the band's first appearance on the American albums chart, reaching #21 on the Billboard 200. The album ended the year on the 1986 Billboard Year End Charts at #10.

Three singles released from this album reached the Top 10 of the Billboard Hot 100 chart: "Conga" peaked at #10; "Bad Boy" reached #8; "Words Get in the Way" was the highest-charting single from this album, at #5; and "Falling in Love (Uh-Oh)" climbed to #25.

Track listing

2017 Remastered Deluxe version (to be released)

Personnel

Gloria Estefan – lead vocal, background vocals
Emilio Estefan – percussions
Enrique "Kiki" García – drums
Juan Marcos Ávila – bass guitar
Wesley B. Wright – guitar
Roger Fisher – keyboards
Gustavo Lezcano – harmonica
Víctor López – trumpet
Ed Calle – saxophone
Tony Concepcion – trumpet
Rafael Padilla – percussion, timbales
Betty Cortez – keyboards, background vocals
Rafael Vigil – background vocals
Paquito Hechavarría – piano ("Conga")
Juanito Márquez – guitar ("Conga")
Suzi Carr – background vocal ("Body to Body")
Emilio Estefan Jr. – producer
Lawrence Dermer – arranger
Joe Galdo – arranger
Eric Schilliing – engineer, mixing
Ted Stein – engineer
John Haag – engineer
Mark Richman – engineer
Teresa Verplanck – assistant engineer
Patrice Caroll Levinsohn – assistant engineer
Carlos Santos – assistant engineer
Juanito Márquez – horn arrangement ("Mucho Money", "Movies")
Víctor López – horn arrangement ("Conga")
Ricardo Eddy Martínez – horn arrangement ("Conga")
Pablo Flores – remixes ("Bad Boy" Dub Version, 2009 Japan Mini-LP CD Edition, "Conga", "Primitive Love")
 Bob Rauchman – design and art direction
Al Freedy – front cover photography
Michael Wray – back cover photography
Samy – hair and makeup
Fini Lignarolo  – front cover clothes

Chart positions

Weekly charts

Year-end charts

Certifications

Release history

References

1985 albums
Miami Sound Machine albums
Epic Records albums
Albums produced by Emilio Estefan